The Great Persian famine of 1870–1872 was a period of mass starvation and disease in Iran (Persia) between 1870 and 1872 under the rule of Qajar dynasty.

The best documented famine in the Iranian history, it affected almost the whole country, however some cities managed to avoid the catastrophe, including Shahrud, Kerman and Birjand.

Causes and contributing factors
Xavier de Planhol comments that the famine was a result of "combined climatic catastrophes made worse by poor administration and the human factors".

New York herald attributed the famine to an increase in the price of cotton which made the farmers abandon farming for grains and plant cotton in its place.

Shoko Okazaki maintains that the two consecutive years of severe drought was the principal factor and rejects that the increase in production of opium and cotton contributed to the famine. He also blames "senior bureaucrats, landlords, grain dealers and high-ranking religious officials who engaged in hoarding and market manipulation". Cormac Ó Gráda endorses the latter reason.

Death toll
There is no agreement among scholars as to the total number of deaths during the famine, although it is believed that it resulted a considerable decline in Iran's population.

Among contemporary observers, Frederic John Goldsmid gave the figure of 0.2–0.3 million deaths, while Oliver St. John put the total loss at 0.5 million. James Bassett suggested that 3 million lives were lost and J. Belleu who was
travelling in Iran during the period, cited 1.5 million. Badaye-negar, a Persian scholar of the time, estimated 2.5 million deaths.

Fereydun Adamiyat calculates the death toll around 2 million deaths. Another calculation attributes a decline in the estimated population from 10 million in 1850 to 6 million in 1873, to the catastrophe. Gad G. Gilbar's estimation of 1.5 million deaths, which could be between 15% to 20–25% of the population, is acknowledged by Shoko Okazaki and Charles P. Melville.

References

Footnotes

Sources

Further reading

 

1870s in Iran
Famines in Iran
1870s health disasters
19th-century famines